Places We've Never Been is an album by saxophonist Bunky Green recorded in New York and released by the Vanguard label in 1979.

Reception

AllMusic reviewer Scott Yanow stated: "The strongest of Bunky Green's three Vanguard LPs of the mid- to late 1970s, this set finds him exploring six of his challenging yet fairly accessible originals. Green's appealing tone and adventurous style work well with the impressive all-star group, and he is in heard in prime form throughout the post-bop release".

Track listing 
All compositions by Bunky Green, except where indicated.
 "East & West" – 8:30
 "April Green" – 7:20
 "Command Module" (Green, Ronald Kubelik) – 5:5
 "Only In Seasons / Places We've Never Been" – 7:25
 "Tension & Release" – 7:55
 "Little Girl, I'll Miss You" – 4:03

Personnel 
Bunky Green - alto saxophone, piano
Randy Brecker – trumpet, flugelhorn
Albert Dailey – piano (tracks 1-3 & 6) 
Eddie Gómez – bass
Freddie Waits – drums

References 

1979 albums
Bunky Green albums
Vanguard Records albums